The Midlands Regional Hospital, Portlaoise is a public hospital located in Portlaoise, County Laois, Ireland. It is managed by Dublin Midlands Hospital Group.

History
The hospital, which replaced Laois County Infirmary, was designed by Drogheda born Irish architect Michael Scott, and was built between 1933 and 1936.

On 5 March 2008, reports were published regarding the breast cancer misdiagnosis scandal at the hospital. A very high misdiagnosis rate was found to have occurred between 2003 and 2007.

On 30 January 2014, the RTÉ Investigations Unit broadcast a Prime Time programme about the tragic deaths of newborn babies in Portlaoise Hospital and the subsequent management of patients and their families by the hospital and the HSE. A statutory investigation was launched and it found that 8 babies had died due a lack of know-how and a lack of resources at the hospital.

In October 2017, it was reported that the Dublin Midlands Hospital Group was considering removing the accident & emergency service from the hospital.

Services
The hospital provides 200 beds, of which 140 are in-patient acute beds, while 10 are reserved for acute day cases.

See also
 Laois County Infirmary
 St. Fintan's Hospital
 Midland Regional Hospital, Mullingar
 Midland Regional Hospital, Tullamore

References

External links

Buildings and structures in Portlaoise
Health Service Executive hospitals
Hospitals in County Laois
1936 establishments in Ireland
Hospitals established in 1936
Hospital buildings completed in 1936
20th-century architecture in the Republic of Ireland